The Sladmore Gallery is a London art dealership with two premises, one at 32 Bruton Place off Berkeley Square (held since its foundation in 1965) and the other established at 57 Jermyn Street in 2007. Its speciality is animalier sculptors (with the Bruton Place premises specialising in contemporary sculptors and Jermyn Street specialising in 19th- and early 20th-century sculptors).

Its Directors are Edward Horswell, Nona Horswell and Gerry Farrell.

The Gallery has posthumously held exhibitions for Auguste Rodin, Aristide Maillol, Edgar Degas, Rembrandt Bugatti, Prince Paul Troubetzkoy and Antoine-Louis Barye. Living exhibitors at the London premises have included Mark Coreth, Geoffrey Dashwood
, Sophie Dickens and Nic Fiddian-Green
.

The Sladmore Gallery also puts on shows and fairs in New York, Maastricht, Paris and London.

The Sladmore Gallery is a member of the British Antique Dealers' Association and the Society of London Art Dealers.

References

External links
Sladmore Gallery Home page
Sladmore Contemporary Home page
Society of London Art Dealers

Art galleries in London
English art dealers
1965 establishments in England
Art galleries established in 1965